Trần Đức Dương (born May 2, 1983 in  Vietnam) is a Vietnamese footballer who is a midfielder for Hải Phòng.

External links 

1983 births
Living people
Vietnamese footballers
Vietnam international footballers
V.League 1 players
Hoang Anh Gia Lai FC players
Haiphong FC players
Association football midfielders
Footballers at the 2006 Asian Games
Asian Games competitors for Vietnam